The Grammy winning Chestnut Brass Company is a Philadelphia brass quintet founded in 1977 to advance the skill and artistry of musical performance, as well as the knowledge and understanding of musical history with particular regard to brass instruments. By presenting performances featuring brass music of all eras, the ensemble strives to reflect the rich tradition and spirit of brass instruments.
The quintet has earned international acclaim for performances on modern and historical brass instruments. Since beginning as a street band in Philadelphia in 1977, they have performed in North and South America, Europe, the Caribbean, and Asia.

The chamber ensemble is active in the performance and commissioning of contemporary music, and has introduced numerous new works to audiences around the country. Composers who have written works for the Chestnut Brass Company, or have been commissioned by the Chestnut Brass Company, include Jan Krzywicki, Pulitzer Prize–winning composer Richard Wernick, Lois V. Vierk, Peter Schickele, George Hitt, Eric Stokes, Theodore Antoniou, Lawrence Siegel, and Paul Basler. The CBC has received awards for commissioning and performance from the NEA, the Pennsylvania Council on the Arts, the Pew Charitable Trust, the Presser Foundation, Chamber Music America and Meet the Composer.

Interviews and recitals of the Chestnut Brass Company have been featured on National Public Radio's All Things Considered, Fresh Air, Radiotimes and Performance Today programs; Voice of America, Radio Free Europe, Bavarian State Radio and numerous radio and television stations across the United States. The Chestnut Brass Company has been featured in performance at the Juilliard School, the Chautauqua Institute, the Ambassador Series of Los Angeles, the Boston Museum of Art, Merkin Concert Hall, Alice Tully Hall and the Yale Collection of Instruments.
As curators of the sounds of ancient and antique brasses, the Chestnut Brass Company have been at the forefront of the period-instrument revival with performances on cornetti, sackbuts, keyed bugles and saxhorns. The quintet continues to collect antique brass instruments and to research the literature and performance practice of these instruments.

Their educational program Hot Air: the Story of Brass Instruments was one of three programs selected by the Kennedy Center for the Arts for a live web broadcast.  The program was renewed for inclusion on the Kennedy Center website.  The CBC can be heard on the Sony, Newport Classic, Crystal and Musical Heritage/Musicmasters labels. Selections from CBC recordings have been included on several documentaries ranging from A House Divided for PBS, to Pinehurst, the History of Golf.

Bruce Barrie, trumpet;
John Charles Thomas, trumpet;
Marian Hesse, horn;
Larry Zimmerman, trombone;
Jay Krush, tuba

Brass quintets
Grammy Award winners
American brass bands